Amir Suljić (born 8 February 1989) is a Bosnian-born Swedish footballer who plays for FC Linköping City as a midfielder. He has previously played for Åtvidabergs FF in the Swedish top division Allsvenskan (and Superettan) and Ljungskile SK in Superettan.

References

External links
 

1989 births
Living people
Association football midfielders
Åtvidabergs FF players
Allsvenskan players
Superettan players
Swedish footballers
Swedish people of Bosnia and Herzegovina descent
FC Linköping City players